The following is a list of cities in the nation of Lesotho:

List

References

External links

 
Lesotho, cities in
Cities in
Lesotho